Jorge Masvidal (born November 12, 1984) is an American professional mixed martial artist. He currently competes in the Welterweight division for the Ultimate Fighting Championship (UFC). Masvidal has been competing professionally since 2003; he has also competed for Bellator, Strikeforce, Shark Fights, and World Victory Road.  He holds the record for the fastest knockout in UFC history at five seconds, and won the symbolic UFC 'BMF' Championship belt. As of October 3, 2022, he is #11 in the UFC welterweight rankings.

Early life and education 
Masvidal was born and raised in Miami, to a Cuban father and Peruvian mother. According to Masvidal, his father left Cuba in a self-made raft when he was young, ending up in the Virgin Islands. Masvidal's father was later imprisoned for more than twenty years for manslaughter and drug trafficking. Masvidal was often involved in street fighting from a young age. There are videos on YouTube of his fights defeating Kimbo Slice's protégé "Ray". Masvidal competed in wrestling at St. Brendan High School, but failed to stay eligible because of his grades. He then began training in karate and mixed martial arts.

Mixed martial arts career

Early career
Masvidal won his mixed martial arts debut by knockout on May 24, 2003, at HOOKnSHOOT: Absolute Fighting Championships 3. He fought in the main event of the Absolute Fighting Championships XII event held on April 30, against current UFC competitor and The Ultimate Fighter 5 contestant Joe Lauzon. Masvidal won via technical knockout in the second round.

Masvidal garnered a 3–0 record in the now-defunct BodogFIGHT promotion, including decision victories over Keith Wisniewski, Steve Berger, and a head-kick knockout of PRIDE Fighting Championships and UFC veteran Yves Edwards.

Bellator
Masvidal was signed by Bellator and entered their lightweight tournament in April 2009. Masvidal won his first fight against Nick Agallar at Bellator 1 via TKO in the first round. However, he was defeated in the semifinals by Toby Imada at Bellator 5, who won via inverted triangle choke submission in the third round. This upset loss was acknowledged as Submission of the Year by several prominent MMA media outlets, like Sherdog, MMA Fighting and World MMA Awards.

Masvidal faced and defeated Eric Reynolds at Bellator 12 in a 160 lb. catchweight bout via rear-naked choke submission. He was rumored to be fighting again but was released by the organization.

Post-Bellator
Masvidal moved up to the welterweight division to fight Paul Daley at Shark Fights 13 in Amarillo, Texas in September 2010. The bout was later made a catchweight of 171.75 lbs. after Daley failed to make weight, simultaneously forfeiting 10 percent of his show purse to Masvidal. Daley defeated Masvidal via unanimous decision. After this performance, Masvidal signed with Strikeforce.

Strikeforce
Masvidal returned to Strikeforce in early 2011, facing Billy Evangelista at Strikeforce: Feijao vs. Henderson. He won the fight via unanimous decision.

Masvidal then fought former Elite XC Lightweight Champion K. J. Noons in a number one contender's bout. Despite knocking Noons down and almost finishing him in the first round, Masvidal went on to win via unanimous decision.

Masvidal faced Gilbert Melendez for the Strikeforce Lightweight Championship at Strikeforce: Melendez vs. Masvidal on December 17, 2011, at the Valley View Casino Center in San Diego, CA. He lost the fight via unanimous decision.

Following the championship bout, Masvidal fought Justin Wilcox at Strikeforce: Rockhold vs. Kennedy on July 14, 2012. He won the fight via split decision (29–28, 28–29, and 30–27).

Masvidal was expected to face Bobby Green on November 3, 2012, at Strikeforce: Cormier vs. Mir, but the bout was canceled along with the event itself.

Replacing injured Gilbert Melendez, Masvidal was expected to face Pat Healy at Strikeforce: Marquardt vs. Saffiedine. However, he in turn had to pull out due to a back injury and was replaced by Kurt Holobaugh.

Ultimate Fighting Championship

2013
Following the dissolution of Strikeforce in January 2013, Masvidal was brought over to the UFC. He made his debut against Tim Means on April 20, 2013, at UFC on Fox 7. Masvidal was successful in his debut, winning the fight via unanimous decision.

For his second bout with the promotion, Masvidal made a quick return to the Octagon as he replaced Reza Madadi in a fight against Michael Chiesa on July 27, 2013, at UFC on Fox 8. Despite being dropped in the first round by punches, Masvidal took control in the second round and won via submission.

For his third UFC bout, Masvidal faced Rustam Khabilov on November 6, 2013, at UFC: Fight for the Troops 3. He lost the back-and-forth fight via unanimous decision. Despite the loss, the bout earned Masvidal his first Fight of the Night bonus award.

2014
Masvidal fought longtime veteran Pat Healy at UFC on Fox 11. He won the fight via unanimous decision (30–27, 30–27, 29–28).

Masvidal faced Daron Cruickshank on July 26, 2014, at UFC on Fox 12. After being dropped by a punch in the first round, Masvidal recovered and won the fight via unanimous decision (29–28, 29–28, and 29–27).

A bout with Bobby Green, first scheduled under the Strikeforce banner in 2012 before being scrapped, was expected to take place on September 27, 2014, at UFC 178. However, on August 14, the UFC announced that Masvidal would instead face James Krause. After knocking Krause down in the second round, Masvidal won the fight via unanimous decision (30–27, 29–28, 30–27).

2015
Masvidal was expected to face Norman Parke on January 18, 2015, at UFC Fight Night 59. However, Masvidal pulled out of the bout citing an injury and was replaced by Gleison Tibau.

Masvidal was briefly linked to a bout with Bobby Green on April 4, 2015, at UFC Fight Night 63. However, shortly after the fight was announced by the UFC, Green pulled out of the bout citing an injury and was replaced by Benson Henderson. In turn, Henderson was removed from the bout to serve as event headliner at UFC Fight Night 60. Masvidal eventually faced Al Iaquinta at the event. He lost the bout in a closely contested split decision. 13 of 15 media outlets scored the bout in favor of Masvidal.

Masvidal faced Cezar Ferreira in a welterweight bout on July 12, 2015, at The Ultimate Fighter 21 Finale. He won the fight via knockout in the first round, also earning a Performance of the Night bonus.

Masvidal was expected to face Dong Hyun Kim on November 28, 2015, at UFC Fight Night 79. However, on November 14, it was announced that Masvidal would instead face Benson Henderson at the event after his scheduled opponent Thiago Alves pulled out of their fight. Masvidal lost the back-and-forth fight via split decision.

2016
Masvidal faced Lorenz Larkin on May 29, 2016, at UFC Fight Night 88. He lost the back-and-forth fight via split decision.

Masvidal was expected to face Siyar Bahadurzada on July 30, 2016, at UFC 201. However, Bahadurzada pulled out of the bout on July 12 citing an illness and was replaced by Ross Pearson. After knocking Pearson down and almost finishing him in the second round, Masvidal won the fight via unanimous decision.

Masvidal was briefly linked to a bout with Kelvin Gastelum on November 5, 2016, at The Ultimate Fighter Latin America 3 Finale. However, on September 14, Gastelum was removed in favor of a fight against former lightweight title challenger Donald Cerrone at UFC 205, one week later. Subsequently, Masvidal was removed from the card entirely and instead faced Jake Ellenberger the following month at The Ultimate Fighter 24 Finale. He went on to defeat Ellenberger in the first round via TKO. It was ruled a TKO after Ellenberger's toe was caught in the fence and the referee called a stop to the action resulting in the end of the fight.

2017
Masvidal faced Donald Cerrone on January 28, 2017, at UFC on Fox 23. He dropped Cerrone and nearly finished the fight in the last seconds of the first round, and eventually won the fight via TKO in the second round after scoring another knockdown. The win also earned Masvidal his second Performance of the Night bonus.

Masvidal faced off against Demian Maia at UFC 211 on May 13, 2017. Masvidal lost the fight via split decision.

Masvidal faced Stephen Thompson on November 4, 2017, at UFC 217. He lost the one-sided fight via unanimous decision.

2019
After a 16-month layoff, Masvidal faced Darren Till on March 16, 2019, in the main event at UFC Fight Night 147. Although dropped in the first round, he went on to win the fight via knockout in the second round. The win also earned Masvidal his second Fight of the Night and third Performance of the Night bonus awards.

Masvidal faced Ben Askren on July 6, 2019, at UFC 239. Both fighters rushed in immediately with Masvidal catching Askren with a flying knee as he attempted a takedown, winning the fight via knockout 5 seconds into round one. The knockout was the fastest knockout in UFC history, breaking the record set by Duane Ludwig. This win earned him the Performance of the Night award, and it earned him the 2019 Knockout of the Year by multiple MMA media outlets. Subsequently, Masvidal signed a new, eight-fight contract with the UFC.

Masvidal faced Nate Diaz on November 2, 2019, in the main event at UFC 244. In a unique situation, UFC President Dana White confirmed that the headlining bout was for a celebratory "Baddest Motherfucker" (‘BMF’) belt. After dominating most of the fight, Masvidal won the fight via TKO due to the doctor stoppage between rounds three and four when the cageside physician determined a cut over Diaz's right eye rendered him unable to continue. Although the decision was controversial among fight fans, Brian Suttere, a Mayo Clinic-affiliated physician, agreed with the decision.

2020 

On 5 July 2020, it was reported that Masvidal had stepped in on less than a week's notice to face Kamaru Usman for the UFC Welterweight Championship at UFC 251, replacing original challenger Gilbert Burns, who had tested positive for COVID-19 on 3 July 2020. Prior to the fight, he signed a new, multi-fight contract with the UFC. Masvidal lost the fight via unanimous judges' decision, scored 50–45, 50-45 and 49–46.

2021 
Masvidal faced Kamaru Usman in a rematch for the UFC Welterweight Championship on April 24, 2021, at UFC 261. Masvidal lost the fight via knockout in round two, marking his first stoppage loss inside the UFC.

Masvidal was scheduled to face Leon Edwards on December 11, 2021, at UFC 269. However, Masvidal withdrew due to injury, and the bout was scrapped.

2022 

Masvidal faced Colby Covington on March 5, 2022, at UFC 272. He lost the fight via unanimous decision. This fight earned him the Fight of the Night award.

2023 
Masvidal is scheduled to face Gilbert Burns on Apr 8, 2023, at UFC 287.

Professional wrestling

All Elite Wrestling

Masvidal made his debut for All Elite Wrestling at AEW Grand Slam on September 24, 2021, alongside American Top Team, and attacked Chris Jericho and Jake Hager.

Business interests
In 2020, Masvidal launched a mezcal brand, El Recuerdo de Oaxaca Joven, through a partnership with Recuerdo Mezcal.

In April 2021, Masvidal announced he was launching a bare-knuckle MMA promotion, Gamebred Fighting Championship. The promotion held its inaugural pay-per-view event on June 18, 2021, in Biloxi, Mississippi.

In January 2022, Masvidal launched another MMA promotion, iKON FC, which would feature both UFC veterans and up-and-coming fighters. The promotion's inaugural event aired on UFC Fight Pass on January 21, 2022.

Personal life
Masvidal has three children (two daughters and a son) with Iman Kawa, a Jordanian American entrepreneur and procurement specialist who is the sister of MMA agent Malki Kawa. Masvidal and Kawa were in a relationship for approximately 10 years before separating in 2019.

Legal issues 

On March 22, 2022, it was reported that Masvidal had allegedly assaulted UFC rival Colby Covington, whom he had been defeated by at UFC 272 a few weeks prior. It is alleged that as Covington was leaving a restaurant, Masvidal ran up on Covington and punched him twice, fracturing one of Covington's teeth and causing an abrasion on his wrist. Masvidal was arrested a day after the incident and charged with aggravated battery resulting in great bodily harm and one count of criminal mischief. Masvidal surrendered to Miami Beach police and was detained at Turner Guilford Knight Correctional Center on a $15,000 bond; he was later released on conditional release.

Masvidal pleaded not guilty to the charges and he was initially scheduled for arraignment on April 21, 2022. On April 21, 2022, a continuance until April 28 was granted after a request from the state attorney's office. On April 28, Masvidal was issued a stay away order and the aggravated battery charges were updated after Covington was claimed to have suffered a brain injury from the alleged attack. On May 12 status hearing a pre-trial hearing and trial were set to take place on August 17 and August 29, 2022, respectively. Subsequently, the hearings and trials were postponed thrice due to joint continuances, first to mid-November, then mid-February 2023 and yet again May 2023.

Championships and accomplishments

Mixed martial arts
Ultimate Fighting Championship
Fight of the Night (Three times) 
Performance of the Night (four times) 
Fastest knockout in UFC history (five seconds) vs. Ben Askren at UFC 239
UFC Honors 2019 Knockout of the Year vs. Ben Askren
UFC 'BMF' Championship
Absolute Fighting Championships
AFC Welterweight Championship
MMAJunkie.com
2019 July Knockout of the Month vs. Ben Askren
2019 November Fight of the Month vs. Nate Diaz
2019 Knockout of the Year vs. Ben Askren
2019 Breakthrough Fighter of the Year
MMAFighting.com
2019 Knockout of the Year 
CombatPress.com
2019 Knockout of the Year 
2019 Comeback Fighter of the Year
CagesidePress.com
2019 Knockout of the Year 
MMAMania.com
2019 Knockout of the Year 
Wrestling Observer Newsletter
Mixed Martial Arts Most Valuable (2019)
World MMA Awards
2019 – July 2020 Breakthrough Fighter of the Year
2019 – July 2020 Knockout of the Year vs. Ben Askren at UFC 239

Mixed martial arts record

|-
|Loss
|align=center|35–16
|Colby Covington
|Decision (unanimous)
|UFC 272
|
|align=center|5
|align=center|5:00
|Las Vegas, Nevada, United States
|
|-
|Loss
|align=center|35–15
|Kamaru Usman
|KO (punch)
|UFC 261
|
|align=center|2
|align=center|1:02
|Jacksonville, Florida, United States
|
|-
|Loss
|align=center|35–14
|Kamaru Usman
|Decision (unanimous)
|UFC 251 
|
|align=center|5
|align=center|5:00
|Abu Dhabi, United Arab Emirates
|
|-
| Win
|align=center|35–13
|Nate Diaz
|TKO (doctor stoppage)
|UFC 244 
|
|align=center|3
|align=center|5:00
|New York City, New York, United States
|
|-
| Win
|align=center|34–13
|Ben Askren
|KO (flying knee)
|UFC 239 
|
|align=center|1
|align=center|0:05
|Las Vegas, Nevada, United States
|
|-
|Win
|align=center|33–13
|Darren Till
|KO (punches)
|UFC Fight Night: Till vs. Masvidal
|
|align=center|2
|align=center|3:05
|London, England
|
|-
|Loss
|align=center|32–13
|Stephen Thompson
|Decision (unanimous)
|UFC 217
|
|align=center|3
|align=center|5:00
|New York City, New York, United States
|
|-
|Loss
|align=center|32–12
|Demian Maia
|Decision (split)
|UFC 211
|
|align=center|3
|align=center|5:00
|Dallas, Texas, United States
|
|-
|Win
|align=center|32–11
|Donald Cerrone
|TKO (punches)
|UFC on Fox: Shevchenko vs. Peña
|
|align=center|2
|align=center|1:00
|Denver, Colorado, United States
|
|-
|Win
|align=center|31–11
|Jake Ellenberger
|TKO (punches)
|The Ultimate Fighter: Tournament of Champions Finale
|
|align=center|1
|align=center|4:05
|Las Vegas, Nevada, United States
|
|-
|Win
|align=center|30–11
|Ross Pearson
|Decision (unanimous)
|UFC 201
|
|align=center|3
|align=center|5:00
|Atlanta, Georgia, United States
|
|-
|Loss
|align=center|29–11
|Lorenz Larkin
|Decision (split)
|UFC Fight Night: Almeida vs. Garbrandt
|
|align=center|3
|align=center|5:00
|Las Vegas, Nevada, United States
| 
|-
|Loss
|align=center|29–10
|Benson Henderson
|Decision (split)
|UFC Fight Night: Henderson vs. Masvidal
|
|align=center|5
|align=center|5:00
|Seoul, South Korea
|
|-
| Win
| align=center| 29–9
| Cezar Ferreira
| KO (elbows and punches)
| The Ultimate Fighter: American Top Team vs. Blackzilians Finale
| 
| align=center| 1
| align=center| 4:22
| Las Vegas, Nevada, United States
| 
|-
| Loss
| align=center| 28–9
| Al Iaquinta
| Decision (split)
| UFC Fight Night: Mendes vs. Lamas
| 
| align=center| 3
| align=center| 5:00
| Fairfax, Virginia, United States
| 
|-
| Win
| align=center| 28–8
| James Krause
| Decision (unanimous)
| UFC 178
| 
| align=center| 3
| align=center| 5:00
| Las Vegas, Nevada, United States
| 
|-
| Win
| align=center| 27–8
| Daron Cruickshank
| Decision (unanimous)
| UFC on Fox: Lawler vs. Brown
| 
| align=center| 3
| align=center| 5:00
| San Jose, California, United States
| 
|-
| Win
| align=center| 26–8
| Pat Healy
| Decision (unanimous)
| UFC on Fox: Werdum vs. Browne
| 
| align=center| 3
| align=center| 5:00
| Orlando, Florida, United States
| 
|-
| Loss
| align=center| 25–8
| Rustam Khabilov
| Decision (unanimous)
| UFC: Fight for the Troops 3
| 
| align=center| 3
| align=center| 5:00
| Fort Campbell, Kentucky, United States
| 
|-
| Win
| align=center| 25–7
| Michael Chiesa
| Submission (brabo choke)
| UFC on Fox: Johnson vs. Moraga
| 
| align=center| 2
| align=center| 4:59
| Seattle, Washington, United States
| 
|-
| Win
| align=center| 24–7
| Tim Means
| Decision (unanimous)
| UFC on Fox: Henderson vs. Melendez
| 
| align=center| 3
| align=center| 5:00
| San Jose, California, United States
| 
|-
| Win
| align=center| 23–7
| Justin Wilcox
| Decision (split)
| Strikeforce: Rockhold vs. Kennedy
| 
| align=center| 3
| align=center| 5:00
| Portland, Oregon, United States
| 
|-
| Loss
| align=center| 22–7
| Gilbert Melendez
| Decision (unanimous)
| Strikeforce: Melendez vs. Masvidal
| 
| align=center| 5
| align=center| 5:00
| San Diego, California, United States
| 
|-
| Win
| align=center| 22–6
| K. J. Noons
| Decision (unanimous)
| Strikeforce: Overeem vs. Werdum
| 
| align=center| 3
| align=center| 5:00
| Dallas, Texas, United States
| 
|-
| Win
| align=center| 21–6
| Billy Evangelista
| Decision (unanimous)
| Strikeforce: Feijao vs. Henderson
| 
| align=center| 3
| align=center| 5:00
| Columbus, Ohio, United States
|
|-
| Loss
| align=center| 20–6
| Paul Daley
| Decision (unanimous)
| Shark Fights 13: Jardine vs Prangley
| 
| align=center| 3
| align=center| 5:00
| Amarillo, Texas, United States
| 
|-
| Win
| align=center| 20–5
| Naoyuki Kotani
| Decision (split)
| ASTRA
| 
| align=center| 3
| align=center| 5:00
| Tokyo, Japan
| 
|-
| Loss
| align=center| 19–5
| Luis Palomino
| Decision (split)
| G-Force Fights 3
| 
| align=center| 3
| align=center| 5:00
| Miami, Florida, United States
| 
|-
| Win
| align=center| 19–4
| Satoru Kitaoka
| KO (punches)
| World Victory Road Presents: Sengoku 11
| 
| align=center| 2
| align=center| 3:03
| Tokyo, Japan
| 
|-
| Win
| align=center| 18–4
| Eric Reynolds
| Submission (rear-naked choke)
| Bellator 12
| 
| align=center| 3
| align=center| 3:33
| Hollywood, Florida, United States
| 
|-
| Loss
| align=center| 17–4
| Toby Imada
| Technical Submission (inverted triangle choke)
| Bellator 5
| 
| align=center| 3
| align=center| 3:22
| Dayton, Ohio, United States
| 
|-
| Win
| align=center| 17–3
| Nick Agallar
| TKO (punches)
| Bellator 1
| 
| align=center| 1
| align=center| 1:19
| Hollywood, Florida, United States
| 
|-
| Win
| align=center| 16–3
| Tae Hyun Bang
| Decision (unanimous)
| World Victory Road Presents: Sengoku 6
| 
| align=center| 3
| align=center| 5:00
| Saitama, Japan
| 
|-
| Win
| align=center| 15–3
| Ryan Schultz
| TKO (punches)
| World Victory Road Presents: Sengoku 5
| 
| align=center| 1
| align=center| 1:57
| Tokyo, Japan
| 
|-
| Loss
| align=center| 14–3
| Rodrigo Damm
| TKO (punch)
| World Victory Road Presents: Sengoku 3
| 
| align=center| 2
| align=center| 4:38
| Saitama, Japan
| 
|-
| Win
| align=center| 14–2
| Ryan Healy
| Decision (unanimous)
| Strikeforce: At The Dome
| 
| align=center| 3
| align=center| 5:00
| Tacoma, Washington, United States
| 
|-
| Win
| align=center| 13–2
| Brant Rose
| TKO (punches)
| Crazy Horse Fights
| 
| align=center| 1
| align=center| 0:56
| Fort Lauderdale, Florida, United States
| 
|-
| Win
| align=center| 12–2
| Matt Lee
| TKO (elbows and punches)
| Strikeforce: Playboy Mansion
| 
| align=center| 1
| align=center| 1:33
| Beverly Hills, California, United States
| 
|-
| Win
| align=center| 11–2
| Yves Edwards
| KO (head kick)
| BodogFIGHT: Alvarez vs. Lee
| 
| align=center| 2
| align=center| 2:59
| Trenton, New Jersey, United States
| 
|-
| Win
| align=center| 10–2
| Steve Berger
| Decision (unanimous)
| BodogFIGHT: St. Petersburg
| 
| align=center| 3
| align=center| 5:00
| St. Petersburg, Russia
|
|-
| Win
| align=center| 9–2
| Keith Wisniewski
| Decision (majority)
| BodogFIGHT: To the Brink of War
| 
| align=center| 3
| align=center| 5:00
| San José, Costa Rica
|
|-
| Win
| align=center| 8–2
| Nuri Shakir
| Decision (unanimous)
| AFC 17
| 
| align=center| 3
| align=center| 5:00
| Fort Lauderdale, Florida, United States
| 
|-
| Win
| align=center| 7–2
| David Gardner
| TKO (punches)
| AFC 15
| 
| align=center| 2
| align=center| 0:14
| Fort Lauderdale, Florida, United States
|
|-
| Loss
| align=center| 6–2
| Paul Rodriguez
| Technical submission (rear-naked choke)
| AFC 13
| 
| align=center| 1
| align=center| 2:27
| Fort Lauderdale, Florida, United States
| 
|-
| Win
| align=center| 6–1
| Joe Lauzon
| TKO (punches)
| AFC 12
| 
| align=center| 2
| align=center| 3:57
| Fort Lauderdale, Florida, United States
| 
|-
| Loss
| align=center| 5–1
| Raphael Assunção
| Decision (unanimous)
| Full Throttle 1
| 
| align=center| 3
| align=center| 5:00
| Duluth, Georgia, United States
| 
|-
| Win
| align=center| 5–0
| Justin Wisniewski
| Decision (majority)
| AFC 8
| 
| align=center| 2
| align=center| 5:00
| Fort Lauderdale, Florida, United States
| 
|-
| Win
| align=center| 4–0
| Julian Ortega
| Decision (unanimous)
| AFC 6
| 
| align=center| 2
| align=center| 5:00
| Fort Lauderdale, Florida, United States
| 
|-
| Win
| align=center| 3–0
| Rolando Delgado
| TKO (punches)
| AFC 5
| 
| align=center| 2
| align=center| 2:14
| Fort Lauderdale, Florida, United States
| 
|-
| Win
| align=center| 2–0
| Brian Geraghty
| Decision (unanimous)
| AFC 4
| 
| align=center| 2
| align=center| 5:00
| Fort Lauderdale, Florida, United States
| 
|-
| Win
| align=center| 1–0
| Brandon Bledsoe
| KO (punches)
| AFC 3
| 
| align=center| 1
| align=center| 3:55
| Fort Lauderdale, Florida, United States
|

Professional boxing record

Pay-per-view bouts

See also
List of current UFC fighters
List of Strikeforce alumni
List of male mixed martial artists
List of UFC records

References

External links

American male mixed martial artists
Mixed martial artists from Florida
Lightweight mixed martial artists
Welterweight mixed martial artists
Mixed martial artists utilizing boxing
Mixed martial artists utilizing karate
Mixed martial artists utilizing wrestling
American mixed martial artists of Cuban descent
Boxers from Florida
Florida Republicans
Sportspeople from Miami
People from Miami-Dade County, Florida
American sportspeople of Peruvian descent
1984 births
Living people
American male boxers
Ultimate Fighting Championship male fighters